The University of Illinois Discovery Partners Institute (DPI) conducts tech workforce development, and applied R&D and business building in Chicago, Illinois. It is one of 15 Illinois Innovation Network (IIN) hubs, each of which is associated with one or more of the 12 four-year public universities in Illinois. DPI has been led by Executive Director Bill Jackson since 2020 and currently operates in office space at 200 S. Wacker Drive, with plans to build a dedicated building within  The 78, a neighborhood under development in Chicago's South Loop. DPI's stated goal is to attract individuals to Illinois tech careers and to facilitate corporate investment in Illinois, primarily through training and education and through applied research and development.

Development of DPI 

Planning for and development of DPI started in 2016 under the leadership of University of Illinois President Tim Killeen and Ed Seidel, UI's vice president for economic development and innovation, with a goal to build an institution where students and faculty from Illinois campuses and other individuals can interact with academic and business partners, take classes, do research, intern with private companies, learn entrepreneurship and work with community agencies. In October 2017, Illinois Governor Bruce Rauner and the University of Illinois System unveiled plans for DPI and the IIN as drivers for innovation and growth in the knowledge-based economy of Illinois.

In June 2018, the Illinois Legislature approved $500 million for DPI and other IIN hubs within the state, and in August 2018 William Sanders was named as interim director of the DPI. That same month, Illinois Innovation Network hubs were established at the three campuses within the University of Illinois System (in Springfield, Champaign-Urbana and Chicago). In October 2018 a hub was established at Northern Illinois University in Dekalb. These have been joined by hubs at each of the other eight public universities in Illinois, and by the Illinois Rural Hub in Rockford and the Peoria Innovation Hub in December 2018.

In September 2019 Bill Sanders announced his intention to become dean of engineering at Carnegie Mellon University. The search for a successor led to the hiring of Bill Jackson, a former executive at Johnson Controls.

Headquarters in Chicago

In September 2022, Illinois Governor J.B. Pritzker unveiled the design for DPI's new headquarters in The 78, a new innovation district along the South Branch of the Chicago River. The eight-story building – a layered dome of glass and steel – will provide more than 200,000 square feet of office, classroom, laboratory and event space for DPI and its university and industry partners.
Designed by architecture firms OMA and Jacobs, the building is designed to create strong connections to surrounding communities, the adjacent riverfront, and the future phases of the larger Innovation District at The 78. The building's main entry will be located at 15th Street and Wells-Wentworth, and a Richard Hunt sculpture will anchor the site's landscape. The project is expected to break ground in 2024, and will be the first building to begin construction in The 78.

Workforce Development

DPI runs several programs to help strengthen and diversify Chicago's tech talent pool. In December 2020, The Pritzker Foundation announced it is giving $10 million over five years to DPI to support and develop promising and more diverse tech talent in Illinois. The funding established DPI's Pritzker Tech Talent Labs (PTTL). Today, PTTL operates a number of programs. They include:
 Training programs for computer science teachers to expand the availability of computer science courses for students across Illinois.
 The City Scholars Program, operated in partnership with the University of Illinois Urbana-Champaign's Grainger College of Engineering. The program places top computer science and computer engineering students in 20 hours per week, semester-long internships in Chicago, while taking a full load of classes at DPI.
 Apprenticeship programs to develop tech talent for corporations in and around Chicago.

Research

DPI conducts research in several arenas, including education and public health. Major undertakings include:

 Illinois Workforce and Education Research Collaborative (IWERC), which provides data-based analysis to Illinois policy and education leaders’ questions to help ensure more widespread and equitable education outcomes across the state. IWERC's initial funders are the Joyce Foundation, the Steans Family Foundation, the Pritzker Traubert Foundation, the Spencer Foundation, and two anonymous donors.
 Illinois Wastewater Surveillance System (IWSS) is a partnership between DPI and the Illinois Department of Public Health (IDPH). Launched in 2021, IWSS collects samples of raw sewage from over 85 wastewater treatment facilities across Illinois including metro Chicago and then analyzed in labs to track the presence of the SARS-CoV-2 virus which causes COVID-19. Separately, the principal partners in IWSS—DPI, University of Illinois-Chicago, Argonne National Laboratory and Northwestern University—test wastewater samples taken from sewer maintenance holes in Chicago neighborhoods and O'Hare International Airport to track COVID-19 for the Chicago Department of Public Health (CDPH). A pilot project launched in September 2022 monitors wastewater collected from schools across Illinois for COVID-19, as well as influenza A and B. In November 2022, IWSS was awarded a Chicago Innovation Award for its leadership in monitoring the ebb and flow of COVID-19 in Chicago and Illinois by detecting the virus’ presence in wastewater. In January 2023, DPI announced it has launched a website to provide data to the general public on COVID-19 levels at the community level, based on its continued disease-monitoring work for IDPH.

Shield T3 and COVID-19 

Shield T3 is the University of Illinois System’s national, for-profit, COVID-testing unit. ShieldT3 has two main functions: COVID-19 testing, using a saliva-based test invented by researchers at the University of Illinois Urbana-Champaign; and wastewater monitoring to detect respiratory viruses such as SARS-CoV-2, which causes COVID-19, influenza A and B and RSV.
 
DPI’s ventures unit supported the scaling of Shield T3 into a national testing model. During the peak of the COVID-19 pandemic, Shield T3's testing process, called covidSHIELD, was used at schools, universities, community colleges, government entities and companies throughout the United States. 
 
In spring 2020, researchers at the University of Illinois Urbana-Champaign developed a saliva-based quantitative reverse-transcription polymerase chain reaction (PCR) test to test for COVID-19. The test bypasses the RNA-isolation step of nasal swab tests, enabling lower costs and more rapid results without sacrificing accuracy. The test also uses fewer steps and components than many other processes, avoiding supply chain shortages that hampered COVID-19 testing worldwide during the pandemic.
 
In conjunction with the development of the test, University of Illinois researchers and staff established a test collection and processing system and protocols to stem the spread of the SARS-CoV-2 virus. The University of Illinois System implemented covidSHIELD testing on its three campuses, in Urbana-Champaign, Chicago and Springfield, in the 2020-21 school year to monitor the spread of the virus and enable in-person learning. The university system successfully maintained operations throughout the fall 2020 semester without any COVID-19-related deaths or hospitalizations in the campus community.

Partners 

Academic partners to DPI include four Chicago-area institutions which are not state of Illinois universities (University of Chicago, Northwestern University, Illinois Institute of Technology and Argonne National Laboratory) and five international partners: Tel Aviv University, Hebrew University of Jerusalem, M.S. Ramaiah Medical College, Cardiff University  and National Taiwan University.

DPI's corporate partners in its workforce development efforts include Apple, Google, Cognizant and CVS.

Funding 

Release of the state of Illinois funding for the DPI and the other IIN capital projects was delayed until, on February 12, 2020, Illinois Governor J.B. Pritzker announced $500 million for capital projects around the state of Illinois, with $235 million to go toward building the DPI facility in Chicago and $265 million to be used for capital projects at the other 14 Illinois Innovation Network hubs. On the same day the University of Illinois announced agreement with real estate developer Related Midwest for construction of the DPI research and innovation center within The 78, on one acre of land donated by Related Midwest. The release of these capital funds was a major step toward expanding the DPI toward its full potential. Additionally, as Crain's Chicago Business reported: "In an era of companies moving entire headquarters to gain an edge in recruiting top tech talent" knowledge that the University of Illinois will build this facility in Chicago can be a selling point for Related Midwest to attract corporations to The 78.

References 

Organizations based in Chicago
University of Illinois System